Bomb Factory is the self-titled second EP by punk rock band Bomb Factory.  It was released in November 1999 on Monstar Records/Hell Hornet Records, and contains seven songs. Tracks 1 and 7 were featured on the video game Dead or Alive 2. An English version of track 5 was made for the updated game DOA2: Hardcore.

Track listing

"Exciter" – 3:31
"Free Chain" – 3:44
"Up Side Down" – 3:00
"Memory" – 5:09
"How Do You Feel" – 4:04
"Dive" – 4:02  (2002 Tecmo's game Super Shot Soccer soundtrack)
"Deadly Silence Beach" – 3:00

External links
Bomb Factory's official website

1999 EPs
Bomb Factory (band) albums